Dynamos Football Club (also referred to as The Glamour Boys or De-Mbare) is a Zimbabwean professional football club based since 1963 at Rufaro Stadium, Mbare, Harare. The team currently participates in Zimbabwe's top-tier, the Premier Soccer League. Founded in 1963 after a merger between two lesser teams in Mbare, Harare Township, Rhodesia, Dynamos quickly became one of the strongest sides in the Rhodesian league, and by the attainment of the independence of Zimbabwe in 1980 had become the country's most successful football team, having won six national championships. Dynamos have since won 22 league championships - a national record - and at least 16 trophy/cup honours.

In 1998, Dynamos contested the final of the CAF African Champions League against Ivorian side ASEC MIMOSAS, and lost the two-legged match under highly controversial circumstances.

Historically, Dynamos has been considered one of the great African teams.

History
Dynamos Football Club was founded in 1963. The team's founder, Sam Dauya, was inspired to form a club for local black players in Salisbury (now Harare) by the establishment of an exclusively white club the previous year and the recent disbanding of two local black teams, Salisbury City and Salisbury United. To this end, Dauya prepared an emblem and wrote a club constitution. Former City and United players were then organised by Dauya into Dynamos, a combined team that, during its first year in existence, won the national championship ahead of white-dominated Salisbury Callies. Dynamos became the first black team to consistently challenge the predominantly white Rhodesia National Football League, winning successive championships in 1965 and 1966. A key player of the original Dynamos team was Patrick Dzvene, who became the first black Rhodesian to play outside his homeland in 1964 when he joined Zambian club Ndola United. Known as "Amato the Devil" or the "midfield magician", he was subsequently targeted by two English clubs, Arsenal and Aston Villa; however, Ndola refused to sell him.

Dynamos acquired their nickname, the Glamour Boys, through their early style of playing: Dynamos played "carpet soccer" – football based around passes along the ground – and based their game around "entertainment and winning, attacking football". The club won three more domestic titles before the replacement of the Rhodesia National Football League with the Zimbabwe Premier Soccer League in 1980, and, during that year, became the first champions of Zimbabwe. Because of the recognition of Zimbabwe's independence following the end of Rhodesia (latterly Zimbabwe Rhodesia), Zimbabwean clubs were, from 1981, allowed to contest continental competitions for the first time. As Zimbabwean champions, the side therefore entered the African Cup of Champions Clubs for the first time in 1981. Dynamos won their first match in the Cup of Champions Clubs 5–0, and, as of 2010, have never lost a first-round match in continental competition. The team reached the quarter-finals during their first season in the tournament, an achievement that was matched twice more during the 1980s – in 1984 and 1987. Meanwhile, the team dominated the Zimbabwean league, winning six out of the first seven editions of the Zimbabwe Premier Soccer League, including the first four. Dynamos also clinched the Cup of Zimbabwe in 1985, 1986 and 1989 as well as the 1983 Zimbabwean Independence Trophy.

The team claimed four more Zimbabwean titles during the 1990s, as well as a further Cup of Zimbabwe and three more Independence Trophies. Following the 1997 league win – the club's 17th overall – Dynamos embarked on a run in the 1998 CAF Champions League that was ended only in the final by a 4–2 aggregate defeat by ASEC Mimosas, champions of the Côte d'Ivoire. After a barren start to the 2000s during which the side did not win a single title or Cup of Zimbabwe, Dynamos won their sixth Double in 2007, and, as a result of winning the Zimbabwean title, qualified once more for the Champions League. Despite defeating ASEC earlier in the tournament, Dynamos were overcome by Coton Sport of Cameroon in the semi-finals.This was the teams best Champions League run in their history. Much of this success was achieved when the much admired Patson Moyo was the chairman of the football club.

Identity
Dynamos are known primarily by their nicknames: DeMbare, Chazunguza, 7 million or the Glamour Boys. DeMbare refers to the club's location and origins. Some sources have linked this to Charles Mabika while the Glamour Boys label has its roots in the elaborate and entertaining "carpet soccer" style of play exhibited by the team during its early years.

The club's colours are blue and white.

Stadium
Dynamos FC have no Stadium of their own. The club relies on rented City Harare Council stadiums.

Honours and achievements
Correct as of 18 July 2016.

Domestic honours

Pre-independence (pre-1980)

Post-independence (post-1980)

Performance in continental competitions
African Cup of Champions Clubs/CAF Champions League: 17 appearances

1981 – Quarter-final
1982 – Second round
1983 – Second round
1984 – Quarter-final
1986 – Second round
1987 – Quarter-final
1990 – Second round
1995 – Quarter-final
1996 – Second round
1998 – Runner-up
1999 – Group stage (Top 8)
2008 – Semi-finalist
2010 – Group stage (Top 8)
2011 – First round
2012 – Second round
2013 – First round
2014 – First round

CAF Confederation Cup: 2 appearances

2004 – Round of 32
2012 – Play-off round

African Cup Winners' Cup: 3 appearances

1989 – First round
1991 – Quarter-final
1997 – Second round

Continental record
Rhodesian clubs were barred from African continental competitions as the Rhodesia Football Association was not a member of the CAF. The newly renamed Zimbabwe Football Association was admitted to the CAF following Zimbabwe's independence in 1980, allowing its member clubs to enter continental competitions starting from the 1981 season.

Following Zimbabwe's independence, Dynamos began to compete in the African Cup of Champions Clubs in 1981 as Zimbabwean champions. Dynamos reached the quarter-finals at the first attempt. This was matched in 1984 and 1987, then topped in 1998; Dynamos reached the final before losing 4–2 on aggregate to Ivorian champions ASEC Mimosas. Dynamos reached the CAF Champions League semi-finals in 2008, but despite defeating ASEC earlier in the tournament, were overcome by Coton Sport of Cameroon.

Continental football started for Dynamos in the 1981 African Cup of Champions Clubs where they reached the quarter-final stage. They beat Linare and Shooting Stars before being eliminated by JE Tizi-Ouzou. Dynamos did not participate in the 2015 CAF Champions League due to a lack of sponsorship.

Controversy
Dynamos FC have long been accused of benefiting from biased officiating as most Referees in the local league are from the majority Shona tribe which also makes the bulk of the team's followers. Their biggest rivals Highlanders FC have constantly complained about tribalism in the administration and officiating of local games.

Matches
Results list Dynamos' goal tally first.

Players

First-team squad
As of 05 June 2019

Backroom staff
As of 24 April 2019.

Directors
Chairman: Moses Maunganidze
Vice-chairman: Vincent Chiwonza
Committee: Chimbari

Management
Team Manager: Richard Chihoro
Head Coach: Herbert Maruwa
Assistant Coach: Biggie Zuze
Goalkeeper Coach: Zondai Nyaungwa

Managerial history

External links
 Official site
 Dynamos FC news page – FootballZone

References

 
Association football clubs established in 1963
Football clubs in Zimbabwe
Sport in Harare
1963 establishments in Southern Rhodesia